The MTV Video Music Award for Best Alternative Video (also known as Best Alternative Music Video) was first given out at the 1991 MTV Video Music Awards. Prior to being called Best Alternative Video, it was known as Best Post-Modern Video in 1989 and 1990. After the 1998 ceremony, this award was eliminated, and it was not presented until over two decades later, when it was brought back for the 2020 MTV Video Music Awards, under the name Best Alternative.  During its discontinuation, artists and videos who would have normally been eligible for this award became eligible for other genre categories, including Best Rock Video.

Nirvana is the biggest winner of this award, winning all three of their consecutive bids for the Moonman from 1992 to 1994. In terms of nominations, though, Green Day ties with Nirvana as biggest nominee, receiving three nominations in 1994, 1995, and 1998.

Recipients

See also 
 MTV Europe Music Award for Best Alternative 
 MTV Video Music Award for Best Post-Modern Video

References 

MTV Video Music Awards
Awards established in 1991
Awards disestablished in 1998